Gav Mast (also Romanized as Gāv Māst) is a village in Bibalan Rural District, Kelachay District, Rudsar County, Gilan Province, Iran. As of the 2006 census, it had a population of 436, in 117 families.

References 

Populated places in Rudsar County